"Hotel Yorba" is the lead single from White Blood Cells, by American garage rock band the White Stripes, and their first single to be released commercially. It was released on November 12, 2001.

Built in 1926, the Hotel Yorba is a former hotel in southwest Detroit that can be seen along I-75 near the Ambassador Bridge to Canada. The single version of the song was recorded in room 206 of the building which is now used as government subsidized housing. Jack says that, as a child, he heard a rumor that the Beatles had stayed there—a rumor that, although false, he loved.

The White Stripes shot much of the song's music video outside the hotel, but were denied permission to film inside; it's rumored the duo is banned for life from the hotel.

The song was used for a deleted scene in the 2002 movie 28 Days Later. The scene does not appear on the DVD, while the song itself is featured on the soundtrack CD released by XL Records.

The single was reissued on opaque red vinyl for Black Friday Record Store Day in 2012 by Third Man Records and later released on standard black vinyl.

Track listing

Music video
The music video, directed by Dan John Miller and shot by  longtime filmmaker/collaborator Kevin Carrico, combines footage of Meg and Jack playing inside what is presumed to be the Hotel Yorba, lounging on a porch in a city neighborhood, and being part of a wedding ceremony in a cathedral. Actress/model Tracee Mae Miller is featured in multiple scenes: when Jack marries her in a cathedral (actually Jack's childhood parish, where he played an altar boy to Donald Sutherland's character in "The Rosary Murders" — the two would later appear together in "Cold Mountain"), when they are sitting on the porch, and when they are walking through the woods (on Belle Isle). During the marriage ceremony, Meg is tied to Jack with a rope that links from his waist to hers. They are also tied together when Jack and Miller are walking through the woods and sitting on the local porch.

After a full day's shooting (quite literally at midnight), there was just enough film left in the camera to do an impromptu, one-take video for "We Are Going To Be Friends" in which Meg actually falls asleep and is awakened by Jack at the end.

References

External links

 White Stripes.Net FAQ
 Photo of the Hotel Yorba
 The Fratellis' Live Lounge cover

The White Stripes songs
2001 singles
2001 songs
Songs written by Jack White
UK Independent Singles Chart number-one singles
XL Recordings singles
Wikipedia requested audio of songs